In Nepal, the House of Representatives (Parliamentary) has 165 constituencies (165 first-past-the-post constituencies and one nationwide constituency from which 110 members are elected by proportional representation), whilst the seven provincial assemblies have a total of 337 constituencies (330 first-past-the-post constituencies and seven province-wide constituencies elected by proportional representation). The current constituencies are based on the Constituency Delimitation Commission (CDC) report submitted on 31 August 2017. As per the constitution, the new constituencies cannot be altered for another 20 years (until 2027) and cannot be challenged in any court of law.

Parliamentary Constituencies

There are 165 Parliamentary Constituencies in Nepal extended into 7 provinces of Nepal.

Provincial Constituencies
Provincial Constituency mean Constituencies of Assembly of Nepalese Provinces. The number of Provincial constituencies are double of the Parliamentary Constituencies.

Province No. 1

Madhesh Province

Bagmati Province

Gandaki Province

Lumbini Province

Karnali Province

Sudurpashchim Province

See also 

 Lists of electoral districts by nation

References